2'-5'-oligoadenylate synthetase 2 is an enzyme that in humans is encoded by the OAS2 gene.

This gene encodes a member of the 2-5A synthetase family, essential proteins involved in the innate immune response to viral infection. The encoded protein is induced by interferons and uses adenosine triphosphate in 2'-specific nucleotidyl transfer reactions to synthesize 2',5'-oligoadenylates (2-5As). These molecules activate latent RNase L, which results in viral RNA degradation and the inhibition of viral replication. The three known members of this gene family are located in a cluster on chromosome 12. Alternatively spliced transcript variants encoding different isoforms have been described.

References

Further reading